RING finger protein 13 is a protein that in humans is encoded by the RNF13 gene.

The protein encoded by this gene contains a RING zinc finger, a motif known to be involved in protein-protein interactions. The specific function of this gene has not yet been determined. Multiple alternatively spliced transcript variants encoding distinct isoforms have been reported.

References

Further reading

RING finger proteins